Dağiçi is a village in the Nusaybin District of Mardin Province in Turkey. The village is populated by Assyrians and had a population of 34 in 2021.

References 

Villages in Nusaybin District
Assyrian communities in Turkey